Local Management Interface (LMI) is a term for some signaling standards used in networks, namely Frame Relay and Carrier Ethernet.

Frame Relay 
LMI is a set of signalling standards between routers and Frame Relay switches. Communication takes place between a router and the first Frame Relay switch to which it is connected. Information about keepalives, global addressing, IP multicast and the status of virtual circuits is commonly exchanged using LMI.

There are three standards for LMI: 
 Using DLCI 0:
 ANSI's T1.617 Annex D standard
 ITU-T's Q.933 Annex A standard
 Using DLCI 1023:
 The "Gang of Four" standard, developed by Cisco, DEC, StrataCom and Nortel

Carrier Ethernet 
Ethernet Local Management Interface (E-LMI) is an Ethernet layer operation, administration, and management (OAM) protocol defined by the Metro Ethernet Forum (MEF) for Carrier Ethernet networks. It provides information that enables auto configuration of customer edge (CE) devices.

References

External links
Additional information on Frame Relay LMI

Computer networking
Frame Relay